or  is a fjord in Narvik Municipality in Nordland county, Norway. The Efjord Bridges on the European route E06 highway cross the fjord heading east on the way to the town of Narvik. The Norwegian National Road 827 follows the western shore of the fjord from the E6 highway heading south to the Efjord Tunnel which leads towards the village of Kjøpsvik.

See also
 List of Norwegian fjords

References

Ballangen
Fjords of Nordland